The 1986 Canadian Junior Women's Curling Championship was held March 15-22 at the Noranda Curling Club in Noranda, Quebec. 

Team British Columbia, skipped by Jodie Sutton won the event, defeating Newfoundland's Jill Noseworthy rink in the final, 4–3. The two teams had finished the round robin in a 3-way tie for first with Manitoba's Janet Harvey, and BC earned the bye to the final after winning a coin toss. Newfoundland beat Manitoba in the semifinal 7–3.

It would be the last year where the men's and women's junior tournaments would be held at separate times.

Teams
The teams were as follows:

Round Robin Standings
Final standings

Playoffs

Semifinal
March 22

Final
March 22

References

Canadian Junior Curling Championships
Curling competitions in Quebec
Sport in Rouyn-Noranda
Canadian Junior Curling Championships
1986 in Quebec
March 1986 sports events in Canada